Tripartite motif containing 65 is a protein that in humans is encoded by the TRIM65 gene.

References

Further reading